The Tibetan Plateau is a plateau in southern Central Asia. It is the highest plateau in the world, with an average elevation of 4,500 meters and covering an area of roughly 2.5 million square kilometres.

Qinghai

Sichuan Province

Tibet Autonomous Region

Tibet-related lists
Tibet
Tibet, towns